Agus Raharjo was an Indonesian civil servant and former chairman of the Corruption Eradication Commission. He had previously served as the director of both the National Development Planning Agency and the Public Procurement Policy Agency.

In January 2017, Raharjo lead a major anti-bribery operation that involved former Garuda Indonesia President Emirsyah Satar. The operation involved assistance from the Corrupt Practices Investigation Bureau of Singapore and the Serious Fraud Office of the United Kingdom and led to the uncovering of a transnational corruption operation involving Rolls-Royce Holdings and the manufacture of Garuda's aircraft engines.

References

|-

Indonesian anti-corruption activists
Living people
1956 births
People from Magetan Regency